Sigmodontomys alfari, also known as the short-tailed sigmodontomys, Alfaro's rice water rat, Cana rice rat, or Allen's rice rat, is a species of rodent in the subfamily Sigmodontinae of family Cricetidae. It is found from Honduras through Nicaragua, Costa Rica, and Panama into South America, where it occurs from Venezuela through Colombia to Ecuador.

References

Literature cited
Duff, A. and Lawson, A. 2004. Mammals of the World: A checklist. New Haven: A & C Black. 
Jones, J.K., Jr. and Engstrom, M.D. 1986. Synopsis of the rice rats (genus Oryzomys) of Nicaragua. Occasional Papers, The Museum, Texas Tech University 103:1–23.
Musser, G.G. and Carleton, M.D. 2005. Superfamily Muroidea. Pp. 894–1531 in Wilson, D.E. and Reeder, D.M. (eds.). Mammal Species of the World: a taxonomic and geographic reference. 3rd ed. Baltimore: The Johns Hopkins University Press, 2 vols., 2142 pp. 

Sigmodontomys
Rodents of Central America
Rodents of South America
Mammals of Colombia
Mammals of Ecuador
Mammals of Venezuela
Mammals described in 1897
Taxa named by Joel Asaph Allen
Taxonomy articles created by Polbot